Denis Sergeyevich Kutin (born 5 October 1993) is a Russian football player who plays as a centre back or right back for FC Volga Ulyanovsk.

Club career
He made his debut in the Russian Professional Football League for FC Spartak-2 Moscow on 16 July 2013 in a game against FC Dynamo Bryansk.

He made his Russian Premier League debut for FC Spartak Moscow on 30 November 2014 in a game against FC Lokomotiv Moscow.

Honours

Club
Tosno
 Russian Cup: 2017–18

Career statistics

References

1993 births
Footballers from Hamburg
German people of Russian descent
Living people
German footballers
Russian footballers
Russia youth international footballers
Russia under-21 international footballers
Association football defenders
FC Spartak Moscow players
FC Spartak-2 Moscow players
FC Tosno players
FC Armavir players
FC Shinnik Yaroslavl players
FC Chertanovo Moscow players
FC Olimp-Dolgoprudny players
FC Volga Ulyanovsk players
Russian Premier League players
Russian First League players
Russian Second League players